Susanna and the Elders is an Old Testament story of a woman falsely accused of adultery after two men who, after discovering one another in the act of spying on her while she bathes, conspire to blackmail her for sex. Depictions of the story date back to the 9th century, but were infrequent until the Renaissance.

The story has been portrayed by many artists; modern scholars explain this by pointing out the appeal to male artists and patrons of a portrayal of a naked woman watched by sexually aroused fully-clothed men. The portrayals by Artemisia Gentileschi were among the earliest to depart from the traditional portrayals of Susanna as not being distressed during the encounter.

The story is portrayed on the Susanna Crystal, an engraved rock crystal piece made in the Lotharingia region of northwest Europe in the mid 9th century, now in the British Museum.

Story 
In part of the Book of Daniel, Susanna, a young and beautiful married woman, is lusted after by two well-respected men. One day they catch one another spying on her as she bathes. Together they hatch a plot to blackmail her into having sex with them by telling her they will testify they caught her committing adultery, which is punishable by death, if she does not comply. She refuses, and when they accuse her in front of the community, testifying that they saw her having sex with a young man under a tree in her husband's garden, she casts her eyes to heaven in a plea for help.

Daniel cross-examines the two men separately, asking them what kind of tree the adulterers were having sex under. The first man says a mastic, the second an oak, and the two men are caught in their lies and stoned to death themselves.

History of portrayals 
The story was portrayed as early as the 9th century. It was frequently painted from about 1470. Susanna is the subject of paintings by many artists, including artists who depicted the scene multiple times. The story has been portrayed especially often from the 1500s, when nudes came back into fashion. In practice it allowed artists the opportunity to display their skill in the depiction of the female nude, often for the pleasure of their male patrons.

 According to Mary Garrard, the scene has been unusually attractive to male artists and male art patrons as "an opportunity for legitimized voyeurism", an appeal heightened by the fact the naked woman in the story was being watched by lechers, allowing both the artist and the viewer of the painting a point of view character in the scene. Garrard points out that it is significant that portrayals of The Judgement of Daniel and The Stoning of the Elders, the other two major vignettes from this story, are comparatively rare in art. Instead of focussing on truth discovered or justice meted out, nearly all portrayals focus on the naked or partially-naked woman being watched or importuned by sexually aroused fully-clothed men.

Garard argues that the possession of a woman who has clearly said "no" is in fact rape, and that the depictions of Susanna and the Elders as being from the point of view of the elders are depictions from the point of view of attempted rapists. Susanna's dilemma is most often painted as not her desire to avoid being victimized but instead whether or not to give in to her presumed natural desire to have sex with two elderly blackmailers.

Depictions 

The Susanna Crystal, also known as the Lothair Crystal, a 9th-century engraved rock crystal in a gilded copper frame made in the Lotharingia region of northwest Europe in the mid-9th century and which is now in the British Museum, depicts in several vignettes the story of Susanna from the Old Testament book of Daniel. Inscriptions from the Vulgate accompany each vignette. The vignettes are rendered in the Rheims figural style.

Portrayals in paintings through the end of the 18th century, with few departures, tend to portray Susanna as making little protest and sometimes seeming to appear acquiescent.

During the Renaissance period there was an increased interest in and production of nudes, which had fallen out of interest during the Middle Ages. Production of paintings featuring naked women increased. Typical representations show Susanna protesting being watched mildly or not at all. Portrayals of the scene during this period typically emphasized the elders' point of view—the voyeurism they enjoyed, their anticipation of sex—and did not address Susanna's distress except to occasionally picture her with her eyes cast to heaven in a plea for help. Norma Broude called these and the similar depictions in Renaissance art blatant distortions of the biblical Susanna.

Treatments in the Baroque period were more likely to emphasize the point of view of Susanna, who is uncomfortable with or objects to being watched, while others continued to concentrate on the male gaze. In 17th-century portrayals, combining Susanna's rejection of the men's advances while gazing toward heaven became common, although in the biblical passage, she does not cast her eyes to heaven until after they have publicly accused her of adultery.

Modern representations depict Susanna as either alone, unaware of being watched, or uncomfortable with it. By the mid 19th century, portrayals often did not include the elders, and the only spectator was the viewer of the painting.

Artists creating multiple images 
Susanna and the Elders, like many scenes featuring naked women and clothed men, was a popular subject, and many artists created multiple paintings during their careers.

Tintoretto 1550–1580s

Rubens 1607–? 
Rubens in his late 1630s portrayal places Susanna under an apple tree rather than a mastic or oak, a nod to Eve, the garden of Eden, and resisting, according to Mark Leach, "supreme temptation"; according to Garrard, the implication by both Leach and Rubens is that Susanna had to be very strong-willed indeed to resist the overwhelming attraction of being coerced into sex by two elderly lechers. In 1886 Max Rooses called the Rubens depictions a "gallant enterprise mounted by two bold adventurers", which Garard called an example of a "remarkable testament to the indomitable male ego."

Artemisia Gentileschi 1610–1652 
Artemisia Gentileschi produced her first portrayal in 1610 when she was seventeen years old. The painting is considered one of the earliest to portray Susanna as clearly distressed at being watched; according to Christiansen and Mann, "no other artist had interpreted the psychological dimension" of the story. According to Mary Garrard, the painting used an explicitly feminine point of view and provided an "unorthodox interpretation" of the scene, calling out Garrard's surprise that until she did so in 1982, no attention had been paid by art scholars to that unorthodoxy. Garrard notes the similarity in composition to that of the 1590 Annibale Carracci but points out the vastly different feeling; Carracci's Susanna appears to be "sexually available and responsive" while Gentileschi's is clearly distressed. Carracci's lushly planted garden is replaced by a stark stone bench and balustrade. The painting communicates Susanna's unhappiness rather than focussing on the sexual pleasure the elders are coercing her for. It is unique in that the two elders are shown whispering to one another, emphasizing the plot between them. Garrard wrote that "in no other version of the subject known to me are the Elders shown whispering to one another".

In early 1611, Gentileschi was raped by Agostino Tassi, whom her father, Orazio Gentileschi, had hired to teach Artemisia, and a second man, Cosimo Quorli. In Tassi's ensuing trial, Artemisia was subjected to thumbscrew, Tassi was convicted but his conviction later overturned, and Gentileschi's reputation was ruined. During the trial she testified that Tassi and Quorli pressured her for sex, accusing her of already having had sex with a servant, a further similarity to Susanna's story. Garrard has speculated that Gentileschi may have already been receiving unwanted attention from Tassi during the period she painted the 1610 portrayal. She points out that the painting is not about rape but about the threat of rape. According to Christiansen and Mann, Gianni Papi identified the elders as having been modeled after Tassi and Orazio. Garrard points out that the Elder on the left in her painting is a "thick-haired younger man", which was "highly unusual in Susanna pictures"; Tassi was in his thirties at the time of the rape. Gina Siciliano points out that the elders "bore the dark curls of Agostino Tassi and the balding sleaziness of Cosimo Quorli." In 1612 Gentileschi completed Judith Slaying Holofernes which some scholars and commenters have interpreted as visual revenge.

The attribution of the painting and its date have both been challenged, but Garrard's 1982 attribution and dating have since been accepted by most scholars. Some believe Orazio must have at least provided guidance.

Gentileschi eventually produced at least three more paintings depicting the incident, typically also showing Susanna as clearly distressed, along with one other possibility which has since been lost and may be the work of Gianfranco Loredan. Her second painting, which does not conform to the dramatic style of her other depictions of Susanna, was in the eighteenth century attributed to Gentileschi, in the nineteenth century to Caravaggio, but in 1968 reattributed to Gentileschi, although Garrard has questioned this as recently as 2001 due to the unusual format of the signature and because Susana's expression is "sharply out of character for the artist". Christiansen and Mann argue that this may simply be evidence of Gentileschi's adaptability. Susana in this portrayal is as described in Apocrypha, which says that "through her tears she looked up toward Heaven"; Christiansen and Mann speculate that the differences in the depiction may have been at the direction of a patron.

Gentileschi's 1649 painting combines two moments in the story, which was common in 17th century portrayals: Susanna's rejection of the men's advances as in the 1610 painting, and the casting of her eyes to heaven as in the 1622. Christiansen and Mann wrote that Gentileschi took "a far more traditional interpretation" of the story than her similarly composed but very different in style and feel 1610 painting.

Rembrandt 1636–1647
Garrard calls Rembrandt's 1647 portrayal one of the more sympathetic to Susanna, portraying her as very young and innocent, but she points out the resemblance to the Venus de Medici, a work considered very sexual in nature because the figure, in attempting to conceal herself, draws attention to herself.

Franz Stuck 1904–1913

Male gaze 

In the production of art, the conventions of artistic representation connect the objectification of a woman, by the male gaze, to the Lacanian theory of social alienation — the psychological splitting that occurs from seeing one's self as one is, and seeing one's self as an idealized representation. In Italian Renaissance painting, especially in the nude-woman genre, that perceptual split arises from being both the viewer and the viewed, and from seeing one's self through the gaze of other people. Susanna and the Elders, like many biblical or mythological stories of women who for whatever reason were at some point naked, was a frequent subject of paintings of nudes.

In the television series and book Ways of Seeing (1972), the art critic John Berger used portrayals of the scene to address male gaze and the sexual objectification of women in the arts and advertising by emphasizing that men look and women are looked-at as the subjects of images. For the purposes of art-as-spectacle, men act and women are acted-upon according to the social conditions of spectatorship, which are determined by the artistic and aesthetic conventions of objectification, which artists have not transcended.

In the genre of the Renaissance nude, the woman who is the subject of the painting often is aware of being looked at, either by others in the painting or by the spectator who is gazing at the painting in which she is the subject. Berger analyzes two of Tintoretto's paintings of Susanna. In the first, Susanna "looks back at us looking at her". In the second she is looking at herself in a mirror and thus joining the artist, the viewer, and the elders as a spectator of herself. Susanna's lack of distress and even nonchalance at being observed naked in both paintings and others as depicted by male artists has been contrasted to the clear distress shown in the depiction of the same scene by Artemisia Gentileschi, a female artist, whose Susanna shows she is clearly in distress at being watched by the two men.

References 

Sexual harassment
Biblical art
Iconography
Christian iconography
Book of Daniel
Art depicting Old Testament people